The 2020–21 Southend United F.C. season is the club's 115th season in their history and the first season in EFL League Two following their relegation. Along with League Two, the club will also participate in the FA Cup, EFL Cup and EFL Trophy.

The season covers the period from 1 July 2020 to 30 June 2021.

Transfers

Transfers in

Loans in

Loans out

Transfers out

Pre-season

Competitions

EFL League Two

League table

Results summary

Results by matchday

Matches

The 2020/21 season fixtures were released on 21 August.

FA Cup

The draw for the first round was made on Monday 26, October.

EFL Cup

The first round draw was made on 18 August, live on Sky Sports, by Paul Merson.

EFL Trophy

The regional group stage draw was confirmed on 18 August.

References

Southend United
Southend United F.C. seasons